The Pine River is a  river located in eastern New Hampshire in the United States. It is a tributary of Ossipee Lake, part of the Saco River watershed leading to the Atlantic Ocean.

Course 
The Pine River begins at the outlet of Pine River Pond in Wakefield, New Hampshire. The river almost immediately enters the town of Ossipee and heads northwest through a sandy, pine-forested valley. The river enters the western corner of Effingham, passing through the Heath Pond Bog Natural Area, then reenters Ossipee  before the river's mouth at Ossipee Lake.

The Beech River is a significant tributary, entering just east of the village of Center Ossipee, one mile upstream from Ossipee Lake.  New Hampshire Route 16, while not following the river closely, occupies the same broad, sandy valley.

See also

List of rivers of New Hampshire

References

Rivers of New Hampshire
Rivers of Carroll County, New Hampshire